Homicide Trinity is a collection of Nero Wolfe mystery novellas by Rex Stout, published by the Viking Press in 1962. The book comprises three stories:

 "Eeny Meeny Murder Mo", first published in Ellery Queen's Mystery Magazine #220 (March 1962)
 "Death of a Demon", first serialized in three issues of The Saturday Evening Post (June 10, 17 and  24, 1961)
 "Counterfeit for Murder", first serialized as "The Counterfeiter's Knife" in three issues of The Saturday Evening Post (January 14, 21 and  28, 1961)

Publication history
1962, New York: The Viking Press, April 26, 1962, hardcover
In his limited-edition pamphlet, Collecting Mystery Fiction #10, Rex Stout's Nero Wolfe Part II, Otto Penzler describes the first edition of Homicide Trinity: "Blue cloth, front cover stamped in blind; spine printed with deep pink; rear cover blank. Issued in a mainly blue dust wrapper."
In April 2006, Firsts: The Book Collector's Magazine estimated that the first edition of Homicide Trinity had a value of between $150 and $350. The estimate is for a copy in very good to fine condition in a like dustjacket.
1962, Toronto: Macmillan, 1962, hardcover
1962, New York: Viking (Mystery Guild), August 1962, hardcover
The far less valuable Viking book club edition may be distinguished from the first edition in three ways:
 The dust jacket has "Book Club Edition" printed on the inside front flap, and the price is absent (first editions may be price clipped if they were given as gifts).
 Book club editions are sometimes thinner and always taller (usually a quarter of an inch) than first editions.
 Book club editions are bound in cardboard, and first editions are bound in cloth (or have at least a cloth spine).
1963, London: Collins Crime Club, February 18, 1963, hardcover
1966, New York: Bantam #F-3118, February 1966, paperback
1993, New York: Bantam Crime Line  August 1993, paperback, Rex Stout Library edition with introduction by Stephen Greenleaf
1997, Newport Beach, California: Books on Tape, Inc.  October 31, 1997, audio cassette (unabridged, read by Michael Prichard)
2010, New York: Bantam Crimeline  July 7, 2010, e-book

References

External links

1962 short story collections
Nero Wolfe short story collections
Viking Press books